Ladce is a village and municipality in Ilava District in the Trenčín Region of north-western Slovakia.

History
In historical records the village was first mentioned in 1496.

Geography
The municipality lies at an altitude of 250 metres and covers an area of 15.688 km². It has a population of about 2561 people.

Famous people

Rastislav Blaško, former vice-chairman of Social Democratic Party of Slovakia lived in Ladce from 1971 to 1979 (he was born in 1971 in Ilava). He is holder of twice bronze medal for 3rd place as the staff member of Slovak FootGolf National Team at the 2. European Team FootGolf Championship EURO FOOTGOLF 2019 in United Kingdom, England and 2021 in Hungary.

External links
  Official page
https://web.archive.org/web/20080111223415/http://www.statistics.sk/mosmis/eng/run.html

Villages and municipalities in Ilava District